Jasminder Singh Sandhu (born 12 July 1994) known professionally as Jordan Sandhu is an Indian singer and actor from Punjab. He is best known for his singles "Teeje Week", "Muchh Rakhi Aa" and "Handsome Jatta" from Ashke. He is also known for collaborating with lyricist Sharanjeet Singh Chohalla Wala on most of his songs. He made his singing debut with "Muchh Phut Gabruu" and acting debut in Subedar Joginder Singh released in 2018.

He had also won Punjabi Music Best Debut vocalist (Male) Award in 2016 at PTC Punjabi Music Awards.
He took his wedding vows with Jaspreet Kaur in January 2022

Career
'Sandhu started his career with the song "Much Phut Gabruu" which was released under record label T-Series in 2015. The song got huge success also he was Best Debut Vocalist (male) Award at PTC Punjabi Music Awards. In 2016, he launched further hits like "Sardar Bandey" and "Muchh Rakhi Aa" and continued his success journey with songs "Birthday" and others in 2017. In 2018, he had released "Teeje Week" which is his most popular song of the career, the second one "Hero" also got huge response and the third one "Handsome Jatta" from Ashke his first film soundtrack was also appreciated. He is also named as Handsome Jatt after the song. Jordan Sandhu's all songs are the best and super hits songs.

Discography

Extended Plays

Singles discography

As lead artist

As featured artist

Filmography

References

External links
 

Living people
Male actors from Punjab, India
1994 births
21st-century Indian singers
21st-century Indian male actors
21st-century Indian male singers